The Bazaly stadium is a football stadium in Ostrava, Czech Republic. It lays in Slezská Ostrava, the Silesian part of the city, next to the Ostravice River. The first match was played there on 19 April 1959, it functioned as the home stadium of FC Baník Ostrava until the end of the 2014–15 Czech First League season.

The stadium was reconstructed in 2003 (added new seats, new V.I.P. rooms, cloak-rooms and press center). The cost was about 30 mil. CZK, cca. 1mil. EUR), and the pitch was replaced in 2004. In June 2014 a new capacity of 10,039 was announced for the forthcoming season. The stadium was closed in 2015, and Baník Ostrava went on to play at Městský stadion instead.

Heavy metal band Iron Maiden played at the stadium for a 38,000 capacity crowd on 6 June 2007. It was the biggest rock concert in Ostrava.

International matches
Bazaly has hosted two competitive and three friendly matches of the Czech Republic national football team.

References

External links 
 Photo gallery and data at Erlebnis-stadion.de
  Profile of the stadium at FC Baník Ostrava website

Football venues in the Czech Republic
Czech First League venues
Buildings and structures in Ostrava
Cieszyn Silesia
FC Baník Ostrava
Sports venues in the Moravian-Silesian Region
Sports venues completed in 1959
1959 establishments in Czechoslovakia
2015 disestablishments in the Czech Republic
20th-century architecture in the Czech Republic